Charondas was a celebrated lawgiver of Catania in Sicily. It is uncertain when he lived; some identify him as a pupil of Pythagoras (c. 580 – 504 BC), but all that can be said is that he lived earlier than Anaxilas of Rhegium (494 – 476 BC), as his laws were in use by the Rhegians until they were abolished by Anaxilas. His laws, originally written in verse, were adopted by the other Chalcidic colonies in Sicily and Italy.

According to Aristotle, there was nothing special about these laws except that Charondas introduced actions for perjury, but he speaks highly of the precision with which they were devised, while Plato speaks of him positively in The Republic. The story that Charondas killed himself because he entered the public assembly wearing a sword, which was a violation of his own law, is also told of Diocles of Syracuse and Zaleucus. The fragments of laws attributed to him by Stobaeus and Diodorus are of late (Neo-Pythagorean) origin. Charondas is said to have commanded that if the nearest relative of an epikleros (something close to an heiress) did not wish to marry her, he was required to provide a dowry.

Notes

References

Attribution
 Endnotes:
 R. Bentley, On Phalaris, which (according to Benedikt Niese s.v. in Pauly, Realencyclopädie) contains what is even now the best account of Charondas
 A. Holm, Geschichte Siciliens, i.
 F. D. Gerlach, Zaleukos, Charondas, und Pythagoras (1858)

Jurists from Sicily
People from Catania
6th-century BC Ancient Greek statesmen
Ancient legislators
Year of birth unknown
Year of death unknown